Nocardiopsis kunsanensis is a species of moderately halophilic actinomycete bacteria. Its type strain is HA-9T (= KCTC 9831T).

References

Further reading
Whitman, William B., et al., eds. Bergey's manual® of systematic bacteriology. Vol. 5. Springer, 2012.

External links
LPSN

Type strain of Nocardiopsis kunsanensis at BacDive -  the Bacterial Diversity Metadatabase

Actinomycetales
Bacteria described in 2000